Sarwendah Kusumawardhani Sukiran (born 22 August 1967) is a retired badminton player from Indonesia. She was the women's singles champions at the 1990 World Cup and 1993 Southeast Asian Games. Kusumawardhani was part of Indonesia winning team at the inaugural Sudirman Cup, also the women's team event of Southeast Asian Games in 1987, 1989, 1991 and 1993.

Career 
Kusumawardhani rated among the world's leading singles players in the late 1980s and early 1990s, though she was somewhat overshadowed by her younger Indonesian teammate, Susi Susanti. Her titles included the Dutch Open (1987, 1991, 1992), the Swiss Open (1990, 1991), the Malaysia Open (1991), the World Cup (1990), and the Southeast Asian Games (1993). Kusumawardhani came close in badminton's three most prestigious tournaments for individual players. She was a bronze medalist at the 1989 IBF World Championships and a silver medalist to China's Tang Jiuhong at the tournament's next edition in 1991. She was also runner-up at the venerable All-England Championships in 1991, this time to Susanti. At the 1992 Barcelona Olympics won by Susanti, Kusumawardhani narrowly missed reaching the medal rounds after an extremely tight quarterfinal loss to the eventual silver medalist Bang Soo-hyun.

Personal life 
Kusumawardhani is married to Hermawan Susanto who was one of Indonesia's and the world's leading men's singles players in the 1990s. Her elder sister, Ratih Kumaladewi is also a former national badminton player.

Achievements

World Championships 
Women's singles

World Cup 
Women's singles

Southeast Asian Games 
Women's singles

IBF World Grand Prix (4 titles, 7 runners-up) 
The World Badminton Grand Prix has been sanctioned by the International Badminton Federation from 1983 to 2006.

Women's singles

Women's doubles

 IBF Grand Prix tournament
 IBF Grand Prix Finals tournament

References

External links 
 

1967 births
Living people
People from Madiun
sportspeople from East Java
Indonesian female badminton players
Badminton players at the 1992 Summer Olympics
Olympic badminton players of Indonesia
Badminton players at the 1986 Asian Games
Badminton players at the 1990 Asian Games
Asian Games silver medalists for Indonesia
Asian Games bronze medalists for Indonesia
Asian Games medalists in badminton
Medalists at the 1986 Asian Games
Medalists at the 1990 Asian Games
Competitors at the 1987 Southeast Asian Games
Competitors at the 1989 Southeast Asian Games
Competitors at the 1991 Southeast Asian Games
Competitors at the 1993 Southeast Asian Games
Southeast Asian Games gold medalists for Indonesia
Southeast Asian Games silver medalists for Indonesia
Southeast Asian Games medalists in badminton
20th-century Indonesian women